Bremerhaven-Lehe is a railway station in the Lehe district of the city of Bremerhaven, Germany.

History
The station was opened in 1863 as an extension of the Bremen-Geestemünde line. In 1896, the line to Cuxhaven was opened. The station has undergone renovations in the early 2000s and is now equipped with a lift.

Operations
The RegionalExpress trains to and from Osnabrück Hbf and Hannover Hbf call at the station. Furthermore, Bremerhaven-Lehe is the terminal and starting point for the Bremen S-Bahn connection to Bremen and Twistringen. Services to Cuxhaven and Buxtehude, operated by EVB, call at the station as well.
The Bremerhaven-Lehe marshalling yard (code HBHLA) is nearby. The next station to the south is Bremerhaven Hauptbahnhof (HBH), to the north lies the closed station Bremerhaven-Speckenbüttel (HBHP), the next passenger station still in use is Wremen (AWRE) on the line to Cuxhaven.
Connections to local traffic are provided by a bus stop (operated by BremerhavenBus) in front of the station. The old station building has been rented out to two tenants, a hotel on the upper floors and an Aldi supermarket on the ticket hall floor. Access to the station is provided by a passenger tunnel underneath the platforms.

Train services
The following services currently call at the station:

Regional services  Bremerhaven-Lehe - Bremen - Nienburg - Hanover
Regional services  Bremerhaven-Lehe - Bremen - Osnabrück
Local services  Cuxhaven - Dorum - Bremerhaven - Bremervörde - Buxtehude
Bremen S-Bahn services  Bremerhaven-Lehe - Osterholz-Scharmbeck - Bremen - Twistringen

References

Railway stations in Bremen (state)
Lehe
Bremen S-Bahn
Railway stations in Germany opened in 1863